CSM Ploiești may refer to:
FC Astra Giurgiu, Romanian football club, formerly known as CSM Ploiești
 CSM Ploiești (women's handball), Romanian handball team
 CSM Ploiești (men's handball), Romanian handball team